Bahçekapı is a quarter of the town Akçakiraz in Elazığ Province in Turkey. Its population is 1,091 (2021). The village is populated by Turkmens.

References

Elazığ District